Dale Hubert Sies (January 2, 1893 – October 17, 1954) was an American football player and coach. He was born on January 2, 1893, in Ames, Iowa and attended Davenport High School. He enrolled at the University of Pittsburgh, where he played football as a guard. Sies was named a consensus All-American in 1917. Seis played five seasons in the National Football League (NFL) and its predecessor, the American Professional Football Association. Sies began his professional playing career with the Cleveland Tigers in 1920 for whom he started one game. The following season, he played for the Dayton Triangles as a right guard. That season, he started in nine games, and the following year, he started in eight games. In 1923, he both played for and served as the head coach for the Rock Island Independents. Sies coached his team to an 8–2–3 record to finish 12th in the league. He started in eight games for the Independents and made good three field goals and eight extra point attempts. That season, Collyer's Eye magazine named Sies to its All-NFL second-team. In 1924, he returned to Dayton for his final season. He made one field goal attempt for the Triangles.

References

External links

1893 births
Cleveland Tigers (NFL) players
Dayton Triangles players
Pittsburgh Panthers football players
Rock Island Independents coaches
Rock Island Independents players
All-American college football players
American football guards
Sportspeople from Ames, Iowa
Players of American football from Iowa
1954 deaths